Smylie is a surname and may refer to:

Smylie Kaufman (born 1991), American professional golfer
Adarrial Smylie, American former basketball player
Chris Smylie (born 1982), New Zealand rugby union player
Daryl Smylie (born 1985), Northern Irish footballer
Dennis Smylie, American bass clarinettist
Doug Smylie (1922–1983), Canadian football player
Elizabeth Smylie (born 1963), retired Australian professional tennis player
James H. Smylie (born 1925), Emeritus Professor of Church History and author
John Sheridan Smylie, the ninth and current bishop of the Episcopal Diocese of Wyoming
Mark Smylie, American comics creator, writer and illustrator
Robert E. Smylie (1914–2004), American politician and attorney from Idaho
Rod Smylie (1895–1985), Canadian professional ice hockey player
Ryan Smylie (born 1992), professional footballer

See also
Smiley (disambiguation)
Smillie surname page
Smilie (disambiguation)
Osmylidae